USS LST-291 was a  built for the United States Navy during World War II by the American Bridge Company in Ambridge, Pennsylvania.

LST-291 was laid down on 25 September 1943 and launched 14 November 1943.  During World War II, the LST-291 was assigned to the Europe-Africa-Middle East Theater, and participated in the Invasion of Normandy in June 1944.

In 1954, she ran aground on a coral reef off James Point, Eleuthera in the Bahamas.  After 11 days of salvage operations which involved blasting a 1,000 foot channel through the reef, she was freed from the reef and towed back to the drydock at Jacksonville, Florida. The damage she sustained was too extensive, however, and LST-291 was decommissioned, struck from the Naval Register on 19 May 1954, and sunk as a target in July 1954.

LST-291 earned one battle star for World War II service.

References

External links
 

World War II amphibious warfare vessels of the United States
Ships built in Ambridge, Pennsylvania
1943 ships
LST-1-class tank landing ships of the United States Navy